Tiger Trappers (also translated as The Hunters and the Hunted and Tiger Catchers) is an adventure novel with the autobiographical elements from Ivan Bagriany life, written and published in 1944 as "Animal Catchers" in the Evening Hour magazine in Lviv...  The draft of the original text remained in Soviet Ukraine and after Bagriany removed to Germany in 1944–1946, he had completely restored the text from memory; this restored version was published in 1946 under the name of the Tiger Trappers at the "Prometheus" publishing house in Neu-Ulm.
Separate editions of the novel were published abroad in 1946 (Neu-Ulm) in 1955 (Detroit),  1970 (New York) (abbreviated version), 1991 (Detroit). The novel has also been translated and published in English (1954), Dutch (1959), German (1961), Russian (1992, abbreviated), and Spanish (2006)
American literary critic Walter Gavighurst, in his review entitled "A Touching Story of Political Exile" for the New York Herald Tribune of February 10, 1957, described the novel as:"This eloquent and exciting adventure story is an equally exciting pursuit of political freedom. It is a novel of chivalry and valor, unexpected wild themes in our grubby fiction."

History of writing and publishing 

The work is based on autobiographical events: the expulsion of Bagrianiy to the Far East,  in the Gulag. Having escaped from the NKVS milestone that transported Gulag prisoner sentenced to death to Siberia. Bagraniy has lived in Taiga for almost two years. And his character, Grygory Mnohohrishnyy, has absorbed many of the author's character traits

While in German-occupied Western Ukraine, hiding for some time from the Gestapo in Morshyn, Ivan Bagryany wrote the work in 14 days. The novel was based on his own bitter experience in the taiga

The work was first published in 1944 in Lviv magazine "Evening Hour" in an abbreviated form called "Beast Catchers". That same year, at the literary competition in Lviv, the novel was awarded with prize.

About the novel

Title 
The title of the work is symbolic. Changing it from the original "Beast Catchers"  to the Tiger Trappers, Ivan Bagryaniy emphasized the story's highlights. Tiger is one of the most powerful and dangerous wild animals. The Sirko family, living in unity with the surrounding nature, and moral strength of this family, representatives of the Ukrainian people, their ability to overcome the most difficult circumstances.

The plot 
The storyline of the novel is built around two figures - Grygory  and NKVS Major Medwin. Their duel is a struggle of man with the world of darkness and hell. The author, as an eyewitness, depicts terrible pictures of abuse of people, the humiliation of their human dignity, violence, condemnation to oblivion in the hell of concentration camps.

The young man escapes from the echelon of death - and in hundreds of other prisoners the spirit rises, there is hope not for salvation, but for revenge on theirs tormentors. He wanders in the wilderness in search of rescue and a safe place - and rescues a hunter girl from an angry bear, even though he was on the verge of death from physical exhaustion. Grygory enjoys the hospitality of the Ukrainian Sirko family from Green Wedge — and becomes their son and brother, a hunting partner. He falls in love with Natalka, but hides his feelings so as not to put the girl in danger - and finally gives her the happiness of mutual love.

Main characters 

 Grygory Mnohohrishnyy is a young aviation engineer. A descendant of the glorious Ukrainian hetman Demyan Mnohohgrishny. Sentenced to 25 years in prison, but escapes from the train, jumping into "certain death, but did not surrender. Ninety-nine chances against one were that he would die, but he jumped." 
 Natalka Sirko — hunts no worse than her father, and catches fish in the river like no other.
 Grygory Sirko is a "hard-nosed, lumbering young man", a young, agile hunter committed to male friendship and family.
 Denis Sirko is an unwavering hunter, a true master of the taiga.
 Sirchikha - the hardworking wife of Denis, protects the comfort and warmth in the house.
 NKVS Major Medwin is a "professional tiger catcher" who goes in search of a fearless and desperate fugitive who has challenged the system itself.

Reception 
The output of Bagriany's work caused a certain resonance in foreign criticism, and the total circulation of Tiger Trappers in foreign language translations exceeded one million copies. The work itself received overwhelmingly favorable reviews and reviews from foreign literary critics. It has been highlighted as a Ukrainian literary classic to read.

Translations in other languages 
Bagriany's novel Tiger Catchers has been translated into almost all major European languages, including English, Spanish, Dutch and German. Unfortunately, the translation of the novel in the last two languages was not done directly from the Ukrainian language, but was translated from the English edition of Macmillan.

The translation of the novel into Italian, Danish and other languages was also planned in the late 1950s.

 (English) Ivan Bahrianyi. The Hunters and the Hunted. Translated from the Ukrainian: George S. N. Luckyj or S. Davidovich, A. Gregorovich; foreword: Samuel Beatty. Toronto: Burns & MaCeachern. 1954 270 p.
 (reprint) Ivan Bahriany. The Hunters and the Hunted. Translated from the Ukrainian: George S. N. Luckyj. London: Macmillan; New York: St. Martin's Press. 1956. 244 p. (pdf
 (Dutch). Iwan Bahrjany. Vlucht in de Taiga. Vertalen uit het Engels door: Peter van Wijk. Utrecht: Het Spectrum 1959. 189 p (Prisma-boeken, 392)
 (German) Iwan Bahriany. Das Gesetz der Taiga. Übersetzt von Englisch: Margreth von Kees. Köln/Graz: Verlag Styria.  . 255 s. abbreviated version)
 (Russian) Иван Багряный. Тигроловы. Перевод с украинского: Анатолий Горошко; рисунки Н. Байкова. Владивосток: Рубеж — Тихоокеанский альманах, 1992 No. 2 (с. 67–144) (abbreviated version)
 (Spanish) Ivan Bahrianyi. Cazadores de tigres (novela en dos tomos). Traducido al espanol por: Myxailo Vasylyk; : Volodymyr Vasylyk. Buenos Aires: Duken. 2006. 336 p.

References 

1944 novels
Ukrainian novels